The 2010–11 3. Liga was the third season of the 3. Liga, Germany's third tier of its football league system. The season commenced on the weekend of 23 July 2010 and ended with the last games on 14 May 2011. The winter break was in effect between weekends around 18 December 2010 and 29 January 2011.

Teams
As in the previous year, the league comprised the teams placed fourth through seventeenth of the 2009–10 season, the worst two teams from the 2009–10 2. Bundesliga, the losers of the 2. Bundesliga relegation play-off between the 16th-placed 2. Bundesliga team and the third-placed 3rd Liga team and the champions from the three 2009–10 Regionalliga divisions.

2009–10 3. Liga champions VfL Osnabrück and runners-up Erzgebirge Aue were promoted to the 2. Bundesliga. They were replaced by TuS Koblenz and Rot Weiss Ahlen who finished 17th and 18th respectively in the 2009–10 2. Bundesliga season.

Borussia Dortmund II, Holstein Kiel and Wuppertaler SV Borussia were relegated after the 2009–10 season. They were replaced by the three 2009–10 Regionalliga champions SV Babelsberg 03, 1. FC Saarbrücken and VfR Aalen.

A further spot was available through relegation/promotion play-offs, which was eventually taken by 16th placed 2nd Bundesliga team FC Hansa Rostock after losing on aggregate score against FC Ingolstadt 04.

Stadia and locations
No major changes happened to the capacities of the team's stadia during the off-season.

Notes
1 Voith-Arena was named GAGFAH-Arena until mid-February 2011.

League table

Results

Top goalscorers
Source: kicker (German)

19 goals
  Dominick Kumbela (Eintracht Braunschweig)  Patrick Mayer (1. FC Heidenheim)17 goals
  Alexander Esswein (Dynamo Dresden)  Matthew Taylor (Rot Weiss Ahlen)16 goals
  Dennis Kruppke (Eintracht Braunschweig)  Olivier Occean (Kickers Offenbach)14 goals
  Björn Ziegenbein (Hansa Rostock)13 goals
  Eric Agyemang (Wacker Burghausen)  Frank Löning (SV Sandhausen)12 goals
  Zlatko Janjić (SV Wehen Wiesbaden)  Marcel Reichwein (FC Rot-Weiß Erfurt)  Marc Schnatterer (1. FC Heidenheim)Season awards

Player of the month
 August:  Tobias Jänicke (Hansa Rostock)
 September:  Alexander Esswein (Dynamo Dresden)
 October:  Björn Ziegenbein (Hansa Rostock)
 November:  Björn Ziegenbein (Hansa Rostock)
 December:  Deniz Dogan (Eintracht Braunschweig)
 February:  Marjan Petković (Eintracht Braunschweig)
 March:  Dennis Kruppke (Eintracht Braunschweig)
 April:  Alexander Esswein (Dynamo Dresden)

Player of the season
The following players were nominated as the 3. Liga Player of the season, with Alexander Esswein announced as the winner on 3 June after a public vote.

  Alexander Esswein (Dynamo Dresden)  Dennis Kruppke (Eintracht Braunschweig)  Patrick Mayer (1. FC Heidenheim)  Marjan Petkovic (Eintracht Braunschweig)  Björn Ziegenbein (Hansa Rostock)''

References

External links
 German Football Association (DFB) 
 Kicker magazine 

3. Liga seasons
3
German